The 1994 Indianapolis Colts season was the 42nd season for the team in the National Football League and 11th in Indianapolis. The Indianapolis Colts finished the National Football League's 1994 season with a record of 8 wins and 8 losses, and finished third in the AFC East division.

Offseason

NFL Draft

Undrafted free agents

Personnel

Staff

Roster

Regular season 
In his NFL debut, Marshall Faulk had three touchdowns.

Schedule

Standings

Awards and honors 
 Marshall Faulk, Associated Press Offensive Rookie of the Year
 Marshall Faulk, AFC Pro Bowl selection

See also 
 History of the Indianapolis Colts
 Indianapolis Colts seasons
 Colts–Patriots rivalry

References 

Indianapolis Colts
Indianapolis Colts seasons
Colts